Allium falcifolium is a North American species of wild onion known by the common name scytheleaf onion or coast flatstem onion. It is native to northern California and southern Oregon, where it grows in heavy, rocky soils, especially serpentine soils.

Description
Allium falcifolium, grows from a reddish-brown bulb one to two centimeters wide. The reddish or yellowish green stem is flattened such that it is thick in the center and thin along the edges. There are usually two leaves, which, as its common name suggests, are curved like the blade of a scythe. The stem is short and topped with an inflorescence of 10 to 30 flowers, each of which is one to one and a half centimeters wide. Each flower has six pinkish, red-purple, or white-streaked purple tepals.

formerly included
The name Allium falcifolium var. demissum Jeps. was coined in 1921, referring to the taxon now known as Allium siskiyouense Ownbey ex Traub.

References

External links

Allium falcifolium — U.C. Photo gallery

falcifolium
Flora of California
Flora of Oregon
Flora of the Klamath Mountains
Natural history of the California Coast Ranges
Endemic flora of the United States
Taxa named by William Jackson Hooker
Flora without expected TNC conservation status